The Maratha Kranti Morcha, loosely translated as "Maratha revolutionary demonstration" in the Marathi language, is a series of silent and pragmatic protests organized by the Maratha community in various cities across India as well as overseas. Other groups, such as religious minorities including Muslims, have also supported the Morcha. The impetus for the rallies was the rape and murder of a 15-year-old girl in Kopardi village, Maharashtra, on 13 July 2016. The protesters have demanded the death sentence for the rapists. Maratha caste dominate the power and cultural structure in Maharashtra owing to their numerical strength.

The rallies feature no leaders and no slogans. Millions of people from all parts of Maharashtra came together to protest, and initially no harm was done to any public or private property until a few instances of violence were noted in January 2017.

The demand for reservations in educational positions and government jobs has also been a part of these protests. Recently, the Bombay High Court upheld the reservations granted to the Maratha community but also mentioned that the percentage of quotas given wasn't justifiable. Supreme court later, however quashed the Maratha community reservations. A large percentage of Marathis are farmers, and the community has been severely affected by droughts and degraded arable land. Due to the lack of reservations, unemployment has become a major problem in the Maratha community. Some castes within the Maratha community, known as Kunbi, do receive the benefits of reservations provided to the Other Backward Class category; however, most people are allegedly out of benefits.

Demands 
 Punishment of culprits in the Kopardi rape and murder case
 Reservations in educational positions and government jobs
 Implementation of recommendations of the National Commission on Farmers chaired by Dr. M. S. Swaminathan
 Amendment of Scheduled Caste and Scheduled Tribe (Prevention of Atrocities) Act, 1989 to stop its misuse.

Influencing factors

Social media 
Social Media has played a key role in the protests; various Facebook groups and pages were created to support the rallies and help groups organize. Many college students, graduates, and IT professionals have been actively managing the protests and providing information using social media.

Social 

To counter the Maratha Kranti Morcha, a consolidation of Other Backward Classes (OBC) and Dalits splinter groups have forged an alliance and decided to organize silent morchas across Maharashtra with the aim of defending their reservation quotas and demanding that the reservation norms not be tampered with or that the Scheduled Caste and Scheduled Tribe (Prevention of Atrocities) Act, 1989 not be amended.

Political 
The president of a regional political party, the Republican Party of India (A), and current member of the Rajya Sabha of the Indian parliament, Ramdas Athawale – the Minister of State for Social Justice and Empowerment said that those earning an annual income of up to Rs 600,000 from all castes should be given reservations in jobs and education. He also promised to bring up the issue with Prime Minister Narendra Modi and BJP president Amit Shah.

Judicial 
 On 7 October 2016, 2 month and 24 days after the rape and murder incident, the Ahmednagar Police filed a charge sheet running into over 350 pages before the Ahmednagar sessions court in which the trio was charged under IPC sections 302 (murder), 376 (rape), and relevant sections of the Protection of Children from Sexual Offences (POCSO) Act.
 On 19 October 2016, 3 months to the incident, the Kopardi rape and murder case trial began in the Ahmednagar sessions court. The special public prosecutor and lawyer Ujjwal Nikam opened the case by describing the charges of criminal conspiracy to commit rape and murder against all three accused.
 On 18 November 2017, 1 year and 4 months after the incident, the Ahmednagar sessions court convicted the three men on charges of rape, murder, and criminal conspiracy.
 On 29 November 2017, the Ahmednagar sessions court awarded the death sentence to all three convicts.

Silent protests 
9 August 2016 -Aurangabad

 30 August 2016- Beed

18 September 2016 - Akola

21 September 2016 – Navi Mumbai

23 September 2016 – Ahmednagar

25 September 2016 – Pune

25 September 2016 – Yavatmal

25 September 2016 – Washim

26 September 2016 – Saint Petersburg

27 September 2016 – Sangli

28 September 2016 – Dhule

2 October 2016 – Hyderabad

3 October 2016 – Dubai

9 October 2016 – Tweet Morcha

9 October 2016 – Daman district, India

9 October 2016 – Badlapur

15 October 2016 – Kolhapur

16 October 2016 – Thane

16 October 2016 – Chiplun

16 October 2016 - New York City

19 October 2016 – Chandrapur

19 October 2016 – Bidar, Karnataka

9 August 2017 – Mumbai

The Maratha Kranti Morcha carried out its biggest silent protest in the financial capital of India, Mumbai, on 9 August 2017. Around half a million members of the Maratha community from different parts of the state gathered in Mumbai. The protest started from Jijamata Zoo Byculla and culminated at Azad Maidan in Mumbai. Schools, junior colleges, and about 450 institutes in South Mumbai remained shut. Mumbai's famed Dabbawalas took the day off to participate in the morcha.

During this silent protest, leaders from the Maratha community also warned that they would switch to violent tactics after two weeks in case the state authorities chose not to act on their demands.

Gallery

Violence

January 2017 
Road blockades (chakka jams) were held on 31 January 2017 to gather momentum and mount pressure on the state government before the community’s silent rally scheduled in Mumbai on 6 March 2017.

31 January 2017 – Mumbai and across Maharashtra
Non-fatal injuries : at least 3 citizens
Arrests : at least 27

July 2018 
On 23 July 2018, a Maratha Kranti Morcha activist committed suicide; the protesters refuse to collect the body and demanded the resignation of Devendra Fadnavis, the Chief Minister of Maharashtra. Kakasaheb Shinde-Patil, aged 28 committed suicide by jumping into the Godavari river during agitations at the village of Kaygaon Toka in the [[Gangapur, Maharashtra
|Gangapur]] taluka of Aurangabad District. The protesters blamed the district administration for not deploying boats and lifeguards despite being forewarned about the agitations.

On 24 July 2018, protests turned violent; protesters attacked police officers and torched buses, police vehicles, and private cars.

25 July 2018 – Mumbai, Navi Mumbai, Panvel, Thane, Kalyan, Palghar, Raigad
 Self-immolation : 5 protesters
 Non-fatal injuries : 2 police officers
 Property damage : 160 private cars in Navi Mumbai, 37 public transport buses in Mumbai, 2 fire brigade vehicles in Aurangabad, 16 vehicles torched, 80 vehicles vandalized in Chakan, Pune, 16 buses burned in Solapur

August 2018 
Maratha groups announced a shutdown across Maharashtra on August Kranti Day 2018 to intensify agitation for reservations. August Kranti Day is celebrated annually on 9 August. The Marathas launched a non-cooperation movement against the Government of Maharashtra and the Government of India. The non-cooperation movement covers non-payment of taxes to government and local bodies until reservations are implemented.

Impact 
After continuously growing protests in each city and millions of people's participation in each Maratha Kranti Morcha, on 13 October 2016 the Government of Maharashtra took the decisions to: and
 Increase the upper limit of the Economically Backward Class (EBC) to Rs.6,00,000, and announced the extension of monetary benefits under this category to students from all castes (Marathi). Students from the EBC category studying in all professional courses would be eligible for benefits such as fee reimbursement under the Rajshri Shahu Maharaj Scheme (Marathi) (Marathi)(Marathi) (Marathi) (Marathi), which was named after the Maratha king Rajshri Shahu of Kolhapur, who introduced the first reservation policy in the kingdom of Kolhapur State.
 Create provisions for children of small landholding farmers under the Panjabrao Deshmukh Scheme (Marathi)  (Marathi)  (Marathi), named after first State Agriculture Minister of India and Freedom fighter.

As the Bombay high court had stayed the 16% reservation granted to Marathas in government jobs and educational positions on the grounds that the data used by the government was faulty, the Government of Maharashtra on 5 December 2016 filed a 2,800-page affidavit to justify the reservations for Marathas as legal and show that it did not violate constitutional provisions. The affidavit contained documents substantiating the claim that the community is socially and educationally backward.

See also 
 Maratha clan system
 Maratha and Maratha-Kunbi
 Social reform by Chhatrapati Shahu Maharaj
 Misuse of Scheduled Caste and Scheduled Tribe (Prevention of Atrocities) Act, 1989
 Farmers' suicides in India
 National Commission on Farmers
 Reservation in India
 Reservation policy in Tamil Nadu
 Mandal Commission protests of 1990
 Socio Economic and Caste Census 2011
 Court Cases Related to Reservation in India
 National Commission for Backward Classes
 Ministry of Social Justice and Empowerment
 Right to education
 Educational equity
 World Education Forum

References

External links

Constitution of India : Part III Fundamental Rights : Article 15 : Clause 5
Swaminathan Report: National Commission on Farmers

Social movement organizations
Protest marches
2016 protests
2017 protests
Protests in India
2016 in India
2017 in India
Far-right politics in India
2016 in Indian politics
2017 in Indian politics
Politics of Maharashtra
History of Maharashtra (1947–present)
Reservation in India
Indian caste movements